The Buelna Formation is a geologic formation in Mexico. It preserves fossils dating back to the Cambrian period.

See also 

 List of fossiliferous stratigraphic units in Mexico

References 

Geologic formations of Mexico
Cambrian Mexico
Cambrian southern paleotropical deposits